Into the Murky Water is the second full-length studio album from band The Leisure Society, released on 2 May 2011 by independent record label Full Time Hobby.

Track listing

References 

2011 albums
The Leisure Society albums
Full Time Hobby albums